The Coca-Cola Cup was a tri-nation cricket tournament played in Sharjah in 1998. This was the first cricket tournament in Sharjah to be sponsored by Coca-Cola and was played under the aegis of the Cricketers Benefit Fund Series. The Round Robin format was followed with each team playing the other two teams twice each. All matches were day and night games and the tournament featured India, Australia and New Zealand cricket teams. This tournament was the first one in ten years which was held in Sharjah that Pakistan was not a part of. 24,000 spectators witnessed the final, a record turnout for a match at Sharjah Cricket Association Stadium, where all the matches were played.

India won the tournament after losing all their league games against Australia in a reversal of what happened during the Pepsi Cup (sponsored by Coke's competitor Pepsi) in India just preceding this tournament, where Australia lost all their league ties to India but beat India in the finals to claim the title.

Australia won all their league matches and qualified for the final, while both India and New Zealand had won a game each, which meant that the second finalist was chosen based on a better net run rate.

Winners India took home US$40,000 in prize money, while Australia got US$30,000 for being runners up and third place New Zealand got US$15,000. Sachin Tendulkar won the man of the tournament award and an Opel Astra that went with the award, apart from winning other awards for most sixes and fastest fifty. Damien Fleming and Ricky Ponting of Australia won the best bowler and best fielder awards respectively.

Group stage

Matches

Final

Statistics

Most runs

Source:

Most wickets

Source:

Desert Storm

The tournament is best known for Sachin Tendulkar's back to back centuries against Australia (popularly known as 'Desert Storm') - the first helped India qualify for the final based on a better net run rate, and the second, in the finals which was played on Tendulkar's 25th birthday, helped India beat Australia to win the tournament. In lighter vein, Australian bowler Shane Warne claimed that he had "nightmares" at the thought of bowling to Tendulkar after being dominated by him in the tournament. Tendulkar is credited for single-handedly winning the tournament for India. The last league match, where India played Australia needing to finish with a win or a better net run rate than New Zealand to qualify for the finals, was interrupted by a sandstorm. Tendulkar's hundred following the storm in that match, which ensured that India qualified for the finals, came to be known as the "sandstorm innings" or "Desert Storm".

The other Indian player who made a notable contribution in the tournament victory was Sourav Ganguly, whose century against New Zealand resulted in the only Indian victory in the league stage. For Australia, Michael Bevan made a century in the last league game versus India, which resulted in an Australian victory but couldn't stop India from qualifying for the finals.

References

Notes
 Records for most wickets in the tournament
 Records for most runs in the tournament

1998 in cricket
International cricket competitions from 1997–98 to 2000
Coca-Cola